Guillermo Óscar Sanguinetti Giordano (born 21 June 1966 in Montevideo) is a Uruguayan football manager and former player who played as a defender. He is the current manager of Peruvian club Sport Boys.

Career

Having made his debut on May 5, 1991 against the United States (0–1), he obtained a total number of twenty international caps for his national team, scoring one goal, in the 1990s.

Sanguinetti played for a number of Uruguayan football clubs before joining Gimnasia y Esgrima de La Plata in Argentina where he played 390 games, scoring 32 goals between 1991 and 2003. He was nicknamed "Topo".

In December 2007, he was given the job of manager of Gimnasia y Esgrima de La Plata, but on September 29, 2008 the day after Gimnasia L.P. lost 3–1 against their archrivals Estudiantes L.P.  Sanguinetti resign as head coach of the team.
El Topo was dismissed from football at age 37. With 383 matches in Argentina and 18 at International became the player with most appearances in the history of Gimnasia La Plata and a symbol of the club Platense. People cheered in his last game against Hurricane and responded with an inscription on the shirt as a tribute: "From Mole to Lobo in 12 years." During his tenure with the club scored 30 goals.

On January 3, 2008 again Gymnastics Technical Director of the hand of the new President Walter Gisande.1 directed against Gimnasia in 28 Argentine Football Official matches with 6 wins, 9 draws and 13 defeats. On August 13, 2009 took over as new coach closed on 8 December 2010 took over as coach of Sportivo Luqueno, A is designated half of 2012 Bella Vista coach his country, replacing Diego Alonso which reaches located in the top of the table at the beginning of the 2nd championship 2012.

In 2014, he was the coach of Alianza Lima. After a great start, winning the Inca Cup, the Apertura and Clausura of Primera División (Peru) was considered above good and the team classified to the Copa Libertadores. The team was eliminated by Huracán in a 4-0 defeat.

After that, things went downhill for the coach, until he resigned from his position on May 18, 2015.

Career statistics

International

Scores and results list Uruguay's goal tally first, score column indicates score after each Sanguinetti goal.

Honours
2014 Torneo del Inca- 2014
Qualified Libertadores Cup 2015

References

External links
  Profile

1966 births
Living people
Footballers from Montevideo
Uruguayan footballers
Uruguayan football managers
Uruguayan Primera División players
Argentine Primera División players
Club Nacional de Football players
Central Español players
Racing Club de Montevideo players
Montevideo Wanderers F.C. players
Sud América players
Club de Gimnasia y Esgrima La Plata footballers
Expatriate footballers in Argentina
Uruguayan expatriate sportspeople in Argentina
Uruguayan expatriate sportspeople in Peru
Association football defenders
Association football midfielders
Uruguay international footballers
1991 Copa América players
1993 Copa América players
Uruguayan people of Italian descent
Club de Gimnasia y Esgrima La Plata managers
C.A. Cerro managers
C.A. Bella Vista managers
Cúcuta Deportivo managers
Club Alianza Lima managers
Delfín S.C. managers
C.D. Cuenca managers
Independiente Santa Fe managers
Atlético Bucaramanga managers
Expatriate football managers in Argentina
Expatriate football managers in Paraguay
Expatriate football managers in Peru
Expatriate football managers in Colombia
Guayaquil City F.C. managers
Sport Boys managers
Sportivo Luqueño managers